Richard Gardiner Casey may refer to:

 Richard Casey (Queensland politician) (1846–1919), pastoralist, horse racing official
 Richard Casey, Baron Casey (1890–1976), Australian Governor-General